Eremophila stenophylla is a flowering plant in the figwort family, Scrophulariaceae and is endemic to Queensland. It is a broom-like shrub or small tree with narrow leaves and pink to brick-red flowers, which grows in the far south-west of the state.

Description
Its branches and leaves are covered with silvery-grey scales, at least when young.

The petal tube is a pink to a dull brick-red, sometimes yellow. The outside surface is scaly and the inside of the petal lobes is hairy but the inside of the tube is filled with soft hairs. The 4 stamens extend slightly beyond the end of the tube.

Taxonomy and naming 
The species was first formally described by Robert Chinnock in 2007 and the description was published in Eremophila and Allied Genera: A Monograph of the Plant Family Myoporaceae. The specific epithet is Latinised from the Greek steno-, 'narrow', and phyllon, 'a leaf'.

Distribution and habitat
This eremophila occurs from central Queensland south to near Yowah and Thylungra, usually growing in Acacia woodland in skeletal soil in rocky places or along watercourses.

Conservation
Eremophila stenophylla is classified as "vulnerable" under the Queensland Nature Conservation Act (1992).

Use in horticulture
This eremophila is suitable as a screening plant or a windbreak, is long-lived but slow growing and has attractive pink or red flowers. It can be propagated from cuttings or by grafting onto Myoporum rootstock. Most soils are suitable and the shrub will grow in full sun or partial shade, requires only an occasional watering during a long dry spell and is very tolerant of frosts.

References

stenophylla
Plants described in 2007
Flora of Queensland
Taxa named by Robert Chinnock